Isadora Ribeiro de Sousa (June 13, 1965- ) is a Brazilian TV actress.

Filmography
 2010 Uma Rosa com Amor - Roberta Vermont (novela sbt).
 2007 Donas de Casa Desesperadas - Vera Marques (série - Rede TV!)
 2001 As Filhas da Mãe - Madalena
 2000 Uga-Uga - Special feature
 1998 Torre de Babel - Vilma Toledo
 1997 O Amor Está no Ar - Carmencita Soterro
 1995 Explode Coração - Odaísa
 1995 Decadência (minissérie)
 1994 Pátria Minha - Cilene Miranda
 1994 A Madona de Cedro - Neusa (minissérie)
 1993 Fera Ferida - Dna.  Marqueza(participação  especial)
 1993 Mulheres de Areia - Vera Soares de Azevedo
 1992 Pedra sobre Pedra - Suzana
 1990 Brasileiras e Brasileiros - Tereza de Ogum (SBT)

References

Brazilian television actresses
1965 births
Living people
Actresses from Curitiba